Major-General Bevil Thomson Wilson  (12 December 188530 October 1975) was a British Army officer.

Military career
Born in Canada as the son of Alexander Wilson and Mary Louise Rhynold-Barker, Wilson was, after being educated at Clifton College and then the Royal Military Academy, Woolwich, commissioned into the Royal Engineers of the British Army on 12 August 1905. The early years of his military career were spent in India and later with the Egyptian Army. By 1914 he was a captain.

He served on the Western Front, the Italian front and in the Gallipoli campaign in the First World War for which he was appointed a Companion of the Distinguished Service Order (DSO). The citation for his DSO reads:

Attending the Staff College, Camberley from 1920−1921, he then served at the War Office for the next three years, until 1925. He became commander of the Lahore Brigade in October 1935, commander of the Nowshera Brigade in India in January 1938 and General Officer Commanding the 53rd (Welsh) Infantry Division in Northern Ireland in June 1939 before retiring in July 1941. In August 1941 he presided over the court-martial of Josef Jakobs at the Duke of York's Headquarters in Chelsea.

Family
In June 1918, he married Florence Erica Starkey; they had a son (Lieutenant-General Sir James Wilson) and a daughter.

References

Bibliography

External links
Generals of World War II

1885 births
1975 deaths
British Army major generals
British Army generals of World War II
Companions of the Order of the Bath
Companions of the Distinguished Service Order
Royal Engineers officers
Graduates of the Royal Military Academy, Woolwich
People from Old Toronto
British Army personnel of World War I
People educated at Clifton College
Graduates of the Staff College, Camberley
Italian front (World War I)